Alfred D. Hughes Unit is a prison for men of the Texas Department of Criminal Justice located in Gatesville, Texas. The prison is named after Al Hughes who served as a chairperson on the Texas Board of Corrections from 1985 to 1989.

Construction 
In 1987 the Texas State Board of Corrections voted to build two new 2,250 inmate maximum security prisons in Amarillo and Gatesville and several medium security prisons. Charles Brown, who was the chairperson of the Texas Department of Corrections, said that the construction of each maximum security prison would cost $60 million. Al Hughes, who resigned as the Chairperson of the Texas Board of Corrections after the meeting that voted in favor of building the prisons, said that the Amarillo and Gatesville units could be built within 30 months. The Hughes Unit opened in January 1990.

History
In 1991 a 27-year-old prisoner named Henry Rodriguez received multiple stab wounds in the Hughes recreation yard. He died in a hospital in Temple.

In 1995 the Texas Board of Criminal Justice approved installing new units for violent prisoners in several existing facilities, including Hughes.

In 2010 9% of Hughes's prisoners stated that they received sexual assaults from other prisoners; this self-reported rate is four times of the self-reported United States average.

In 2012 an inmate named Allen Burbarker was strangled to death at the Hughes Unit. An inmate named Joseph Chargualaf was indicted in 2013 for capital murder. Chargualaf was serving a 45-year sentence for murder at the time. .

Notable prisoners
Samuel Hadden Gifford, perpetrator of the murders of John Goosey and Stacy Barnett
Brian Salter, perpetrator of the murder of Caren Koslow kenneth Allen macduff and David Wayne spence
Scott Matthew Marshall An SMU Law School graduate, drug addict and perpetrator of the murder of Staci Michelle Montgomery, the ex-wife of his law partner Bady Sassin.

Adam Garibay, Former border patrol agent convicted for the shooting death of his estranged wife's lover Keith Martin

References

External links

 "Alfred D. Hughes Unit." Texas Department of Criminal Justice.

Prisons in Gatesville, Texas
1990 establishments in Texas
Buildings and structures in Coryell County, Texas